UPC Polska is Iliad's telecommunications operation in Poland. It is one of the largest provider of broadband internet, digital television, telephony and mobile services (as an MVNO based on Play's network) in Poland. It was founded in 2000 when Liberty Global acquired Polska Telewizja Kablowa (PTK). According to the SpeedTest.pl ranking, in 2021 UPC was the fastest nationwide home internet provider in Poland. At the end of Q3, 2021, the company offered to over 1,5 million customers in Poland more than 3,3 million digital subscritpions; its network reached nearly 3,7 million households.

On September 22, 2021, Iliad, the owner of Play, acquired UPC Poland from Liberty Global for US$1.8 billion. The deal was closed on April 1, 2022.

References

External links

Telecommunications companies of Poland
Cable television companies
Liberty Global
1989 establishments in Poland
Polish subsidiaries of foreign companies
Polish Limited Liability Companies